Luiz Carlos Pereira (born 6 March 1960 in São Paulo), nicknamed "The Spanish Goose", is a retired Brazilian football player.

Club statistics

Honours

Individual Honors
 J. League Most Valuable Player: 1994
 J. League Best Eleven: 1993, 1994
 Japanese Footballer of the Year: 1994

Team Honors
 J1 League: 1993, 1994

References

External links

CBF BID

1960 births
Living people
Brazilian footballers
Brazilian expatriate footballers
Expatriate footballers in Japan
J1 League players
Japan Football League (1992–1998) players
Guarani FC players
Tokyo Verdy players
Hokkaido Consadole Sapporo players
J1 League Player of the Year winners
Footballers from São Paulo
Association football defenders